Government Madhav Arts and Commerce College, Ujjain, also known by the shorter names as Government Madhav College, Ujjain or Madhav College, is a government college located in Ujjain, Madhya Pradesh, India. It is recognized by the University Grants Commission (UGC) and affiliated to Vikram University.

Notable alumni
Anil Firojiya, Indian politician and Member of Parliament in the 17th Lok Sabha

References

External links
 

Commerce colleges in India
Universities and colleges in Madhya Pradesh
Education in Ujjain
Educational institutions established in 1890
1890 establishments in India